Brycon is a genus of fish in the family Characidae found in freshwater habitats in Central and South America, ranging from southern Mexico to northern Argentina. Despite not being closely related to true trout, they are sometimes called South American trout. Members of the genus may be referred to by a number of other different common names in various languages. They reach a maximum length of  depending on the species involved. Some species perform seasonal breeding migrations.

They feed heavily on fruits and seeds, but also take other plant material, invertebrates and small fish. Their food is typically taken from the water, but they are able to jump out of the water to "pluck" low-hanging seeds and fruits directly from trees. Some seeds are crushed when eaten, but may also pass undamaged through the fish, making them seed dispersers.

Brycon support important fisheries and based on a review by IBAMA, they are the fifth most caught fish by weight in the Brazilian Amazon.

Species

There are currently 46 recognized species in this genus:

 Brycon alburnus (Günther, 1860)
 Brycon amazonicus (Spix & Agassiz, 1829)
 Brycon argenteus Meek & Hildebrand, 1913
 Brycon atrocaudatus (Kner, 1863)
 Brycon behreae Hildebrand, 1938
 Brycon bicolor Pellegrin, 1909
 Brycon cephalus (Günther, 1869)
 Brycon chagrensis (Kner, 1863)
 Brycon coquenani Steindachner, 1915
 Brycon costaricensis Angulo & Gracian-Negrete, 2013
 Brycon coxeyi Fowler, 1943
 Brycon dentex Günther, 1860
 Brycon devillei (Castelnau, 1855)
 Brycon dulcis F. C. T. Lima & F. Vieira, 2017
 Brycon falcatus J. P. Müller & Troschel, 1844
 Brycon ferox Steindachner, 1877
 Brycon fowleri Dahl, 1955
 Brycon gouldingi F. C. T. Lima, 2004
 Brycon guatemalensis Regan, 1908
 Brycon henni C. H. Eigenmann, 1913
 Brycon hilarii (Valenciennes, 1850)
 Brycon howesi F. C. T. Lima, 2017
 Brycon insignis Steindachner, 1877
 Brycon labiatus Steindachner, 1879
 Brycon medemi Dahl, 1960
 Brycon meeki C. H. Eigenmann & Hildebrand, 1918
 Brycon melanopterus (Cope, 1872)
 Brycon moorei Steindachner, 1878
 Brycon nattereri Günther, 1864
 Brycon obscurus Hildebrand, 1938
 Brycon oligolepis Regan, 1913
 Brycon opalinus (G. Cuvier, 1819)
 Brycon orbignyanus (Valenciennes, 1850)
 Brycon orthotaenia Günther, 1864
 Brycon pesu J. P. Müller & Troschel, 1845
 Brycon petrosus Meek & Hildebrand, 1913
 Brycon polylepis Moscó Morales, 1988
 Brycon posadae Fowler, 1945
 Brycon rubricauda Steindachner, 1879
 Brycon sinuensis Dahl, 1955
 Brycon stolzmanni Steindachner, 1879
 Brycon striatulus (Kner, 1863)
 Brycon unicolor Moscó Morales, 1988
 Brycon vermelha F. C. T. Lima & R. M. C. Castro, 2000
 Brycon vonoi F. C. T. Lima, 2017
 Brycon whitei G. S. Myers & S. H. Weitzman, 1960

References

 
Characidae
Freshwater fish genera
Taxa named by Johannes Peter Müller
Taxa named by Franz Hermann Troschel
Taxonomy articles created by Polbot